Sanabad (also Romanized as Sanābād) is a village in Barzavand Rural District, in the Central District of Ardestan County, Isfahan Province, Iran. At the 2006 census, its population was 15, in 9 families.

References 

Populated places in Ardestan County